The 2003 Plateau State gubernatorial election occurred on April 19, 2003. Incumbent Governor PDP's Joshua Dariye won election for a second term, defeating ANPP's Jonah David Jang and AD's Damishi Sango.

Joshua Dariye emerged winner in the PDP gubernatorial primary election. His running mate was Michael Botmang.

Electoral system
The Governor of Plateau State is elected using the plurality voting system.

Results
A total of three candidates registered with the Independent National Electoral Commission to contest in the election. PDP Governor Joshua Dariye won re-election for a second term, defeating ANPP's Jonah David Jang and AD's Damishi Sango.

The total number of registered voters in the state was 1,391,594. However, only 76.66% (i.e. 1,066,795) of registered voters participated in the excerise.

References 

Plateau State gubernatorial elections
Gubernatorial election 2003
Plateau State gubernatorial election